Arthur Edward Kirk (5 January 1878 – 28 February 1958) was an Australian rules footballer who played for the Melbourne Football Club in the Victorian Football League (VFL).

Notes

External links 

 

1878 births
1958 deaths
Australian rules footballers from Melbourne
Melbourne Football Club players